¡El pueblo quiere saber de qué se trata! ("The people want to know what is going on!") is an anonymous Spanish-language phrase from Argentina. It was first used during the May Revolution, the event that began the Argentine War of Independence. An open cabildo deposed the viceroy Baltasar Hidalgo de Cisneros and ordered the establishment of a government junta, but the cabildo appointed the viceroy as the president of said junta. A huge demonstration forced the cabildo to undo the appointment, and establish instead a junta with members selected by the people. 

Similarly to the event, it would be used in Argentine politics when the people requested transparency to the acts of government.

References

May Revolution
Political quotes
Spanish words and phrases
1810 in Argentina
1810s neologisms